The 2014 Best of Nollywood Awards was the 6th edition of the Best of Nollywood Awards ceremony, and took place in Port Harcourt, Nigeria on October 16, 2014. The event was hosted by Gbemi Olateru-Olagbegi and Fred Amata with special performances from Wizkid and Okey Bakassi.

Awards

Best Actor in Leading Role (English)
Kanayo O. Kanayo – Apaye
Joseph Benjamin (actor) - Don’t Cry for me
Gbenga Akinnagbe - Render to Caesar
Tope Tedela - A Mile from Home
Femi Jacobs - The Meeting (film)
Bob-Manuel Udokwu - Dining with a Long Spoon

Best Actor in Leading Role (Yoruba)
Odunade Adekola - 
Niyi Johnson - Oritoke
Yinka Quadri - Aremo Ite
Muyiwa Ademola - Eja Nla
Femi Adebayo - Fifehanmi

Best Actor in Leading Role(Hausa)
Yakubu Mohammed - Duniya Han
Sani Danja - Byrin Zuciya
Ibrahim Maishunk - Aduniya
Adam A Zango - Ruwan Jakara
Sadik Sani - Hadarin Gabas

Best Actor in Leading Role (Igbo)
Okey Bakasi - Onye Ozi

Best Actress in Leading Role (English) 
Omoni Oboli - Being Mrs Elliot
Ivie Okujaye - Black Silhouette
 Mary Lazarus - Don’t Cry for Me
Clarion Chukwura - Apaye
Fati Zanna – Our Difference
Ijeoma Grace Agu - Misfit

Best Actress in Leading Role (Yoruba)
Bimbo Oshin Ibironke] - Feresisemi
Yewande Adekoya - Kudi Klepto
Bidemi Kosoko - Kori Koto
Sheyi Ashekun - Fifehanmi
Iyabo Ojo - Silence

Best Actress in Leading Role (Igbo) 
Ngozi Igwebike - Onye Ozi
Queen Nwokoye - Adamobi

Best Actress in Leading Role (Hausa)
Fati Washa - Bincike
Fati Ladan- Byrin Zuriya
Nafisat Abdullahi- Ruwan Jakara
Asmau Abubakar - Hadarin Gabas

Best supporting Actor (English) 
 Sidney Onoriode Esiri- Last 3 Digits
 Chidozie Nzeribe - A Mile from Home
 Ayo Makun - Being Mrs Elliot
 Kalu Ikeagwu - Blue Flames
 Femi Jacobs - Dream Walker

Best supporting Actress (English) 
Mercy Johnson - Hustlers
Uru Eke - Dining with a Long Spoon
Evelyn Sin - Seven Rivers
Rita Dominic- The Meeting (film)
Nse Ikpe Etim - Dream Walker

Best supporting Actor (Yoruba)
Razak Olayiwola - Sanbe
Dele Odule - Kori-koto
Muyiwa Ademola - Oritoke
Abdulateef Adedimeji - Kudi Klepto
Jamiu Azeez - Orofo

Best supporting Actress (Yoruba) 
Biola Segun-Willams - Silence
Fathia Balogun - Ina Loju Ekun
Biodun Okeowo - Orofo
Ayo Adesanya - Sanbe
Odunayo Agoro - Osunfunke

Most Promising Actor 
Jamiu Azeez - Orofo
Abdulateef Adedimeji - Kudi klepto
Temisan Etsede
Sidney Esiri - 3 Digits

Most Promising Actress
Ivie Okujaye - Black Silo
Ijeoma Grace Agu - Misfits
Jackie Idumogu firs
Oyinka Elebuibon Sanbe

Best Child Actor in Movie
Olamide David - Black Silhouette
Chisom Okusua - Mama Africa
Elitim Wari - Apaye
D’Kachy Emelonye - Onye Ozi

Best Child Actress in Movie
Carol Micheal - Apaye
Toyin Eniola - Oritoke  co-winners 
Chinny Okemuo - Onye Ozi
Pricillia Ojo - Silence  co-winners

Best Movie of the Year
Apaye
A Mile from Home
The Meeting (film)
First Cause
Silence

Best Comedy of the Year
I Come Lagos
Onye Ozi
30 Days in Atlanta
Our Lucky Day
Mimiado

Movie with the Best Social Message
Oritoke
Knocking on Heaven's Door (2014 film)
Black Silhouette
Our Difference
Dream Walker
First Cause

Movie with the Best Special Effect
A Mile from Home
Aduniya
Seven Rivers (Onaji Stephen Onche)
The Origin
Ina loju Ekun

Best Kiss in a Movie
Gabriel Afolayan and Jackie Idumogu - First Cause
Majid Michel and Beverly Naya - Forgetting June
Joseph Benjamin (actor) and Ini Edo  - Perfect Plan
Monalisa Chinda and Lugo Tourton - Lagos Cougars
Blossom Chukwujeku and Ini Edo - Knocking on Heaven's Door (2014 film)

Best use of Make up in a Movie
Seven Rivers
Kudi Klepto
Cobra
Mama Africa
Aremo Ife

Best Cinematography 
Osunfunke
Apaye
Being Mrs Elliot
The Meeting
30 Days in Atlanta

Screenplay of the Year
A Mile from Home
The Meeting (film)
Secret Room
Render to Caesar
Silence

Best Short Film 
Brave
Wages
Not Right
New Morning
Living Funeral
Alpha Mum

Best Documentary
Fatai Rolling Dollar
Bad Budgeting for Development
Seeds of Growth

Best TV Series
Lekki Wives
The Johnsons
Dear Mother
New Horizon
Happy Family

Best Edited Movie
Apaye
A Mile from Home
Last 3 digits
Silence
30 days in Atlanta

Best Use of Food in a Movie
Being Mrs Elliot
Apaye
Seven Rivers

Movie with the Best Sound
Osunfunke
Render to Caesar
Apaye
Being Mrs Elliot
The Meeting (film)

Movie with the Best Production Design
Being Mrs Elliot
Apaye
Seven Rivers
Iyawo Osun
Osunfunke

Director of the Year
Eric Aghimien - A Mile from Home
Desmond Elliot - Apaye
Mildred Okwo - The Meeting
Dj Tee- Osunfunke
Alex Mouth - Silence

Revelation of the year (Male)
Tope Tedela
Adams Kehinde
Blossom Chukwujekwu
Daniel Ugorije
Daniel K Daniel

Revelation of the Year (Female)
Seyi Edun
Biola Olasheni
Uche Nwayanwu
Linda Ejiofor

References

2014 in Nigerian cinema
Nollywood
2014